Calixa Lavallée (December 28, 1842 – January 21, 1891) was a French-Canadian-American musician and Union Army band musician during the American Civil War. He is best known for composing the music for "O Canada," which officially became the national anthem of Canada in 1980, after a vote in the Senate and the House of Commons. The same 1980 Act of Parliament also changed some of the English lyrics. A slight alteration to the English lyrics was made again in 2018. The original French lyrics and the music, however, have remained unchanged since 1880.

Early life and education
Lavallée was born Calixte Paquet dit Lavallée, the son of Jean Baptiste Paquet and Charlotte Valentine.  He was born near Verchères, a village near present-day Montreal in the Province of Canada (now the Canadian province of Quebec). He was a descendant of Isaac Pasquier, from Poitou, France, who arrived in Nouvelle-France in 1665 as a soldier in the Carignan-Salières regiment. Lavallée's father Augustin Lavallée, worked as a blacksmith, logger, bandmaster, self-taught luthier and bandleader, and also worked for the pipe organ builder Joseph Casavant. Calixa Lavallée's mother was Charlotte-Caroline Valentine, descendant of James Valentine, a soldier from Montrose, Scotland who married a Quebecer by the name of Louise Leclerc and then settled down in Verchères, Québec.

Lavallée began his musical education with his father (Eli Grande), who taught him organ by age 11. Lavallée also studied in Montréal with Paul Letondal and Charles Wugk Sabatier.

Career
Lavallée gave his first performance at Montreal's Theatre Royal (on Côté Street) on 28 February 1859 and later that year he was hired by Charles Duprez to play violin, cornet, and piano in a travelling minstrel troupe. With this company, the New Orleans Minstrels, Lavallée travelled through much of the United States in the years leading up to the outbreak of the Civil War. 

On September 17th, 1861, Lavallée enlisted in the 4th Rhode Island Infantry Regiment in Providence, as a private and a musician in the regimental band. He served with the 4th in the American Civil War until he was mustered out on October 3rd, 1862. He then rejoined Duprez's company and continued to tour until the fall of 1863, when he returned to Montreal.

Between December 1863 and the early months of 1866 Lavallée organized concerts, composed and taught. In 1866, he was hired once again by Duprez and left for the US, where he would remain until 1872. In December 1867, he married an American woman, Josephine Gentilly, while in Lowell, Massachusetts.

After two years in Paris, Lavallée returned to Montreal in July 1875, where he continued to perform and compose. Between 1875 and 1880, he lived in Montreal and Quebec City, where he worked as a pianist, organist and music teacher, and also conducted orchestral and operatic productions in concert halls, including the Montréal Academy of Music in Montréal, Quebec City and in many U.S. cities. Among his pupils was composer Alexis Contant.

To celebrate St. Jean-Baptiste Day in 1880, the Lieutenant Governor of Québec, Théodore Robitaille, commissioned Lavallée to compose "O Canada" to a patriotic poem by Adolphe-Basile Routhier. After some financial difficulties in Canada, Lavallée again moved to the United States. In his later life he promoted the idea of union between Canada and the U.S.

Later life and death
During the later years of his life, Lavallée was the choirmaster at the Cathedral of the Holy Cross in Boston, and he died penniless in that city in 1891. As the result of the campaign by the Montréal-based music director of the Victoria's Rifles, Joseph-Laurent Gariépy, his remains were returned to Montréal and reinterred at Côte-des-Neiges Cemetery in 1933.

Selected musical works 

Peacocks in Difficulties/Loulou, comic opera
The Bridal Rose Overture, operetta
The King of Diamonds, overture
L'Absence, lyrics by Remi Tremblay, 1882–1885
L'Oiseau Mouche, Bluette de Salon, Op.11, 1865?
La Rose Nuptiale, brass quintet
Une Couronne de Lauriers, Caprice de Genre, Op.10, 1865
Le Papillon (The Butterfly) Étude de Concert for piano, 1874/1884
La Patrie (1874).
Marche funèbre, 1878
Violette, cantilène, lyrics by Napoleon Legendre and P.J. Curran, 1879
"O Canada", 1880
The Widow, 1881, comic opera (known in French as La veuve)
 TIQ (The Indian Question), Settled at Last, 1882, comic opera

Legacy
The village of Calixa-Lavallée, southeast of Montreal, is named after him. The professional training school Calixa-Lavallée in Quebec also bears his name. The following roads were named to honour Calixa Lavallée:
Avenue Calixa-Lavallée, located in Shawinigan, Quebec, Canada.
Avenue Calixa-Lavallée, located in Quebec, Quebec, Canada.
Rue Calixa-Lavallée, located in Magog, Quebec, Canada.
Rue Calixa-Lavallée, located in Boucherville, Quebec, Canada.
Rue Calixa-Lavallée, located in Repentigny, Quebec, Canada.
Rue Calixa-Lavallée, a dead-end street entering into Lafontaine Park, Montreal, Quebec, Canada.
Avenue Calixa-Lavallée located in Laval, Québec, Canada.
Calixa-Lavallée Privée (Calixa-Lavallée Pvt.) a small dead-end laneway on the University of Ottawa campus

See also 

 Calixa-Lavallée Award
 Music of Canada
 List of Canadian composers
 Canada in the American Civil War

Bibliography
Notes

References 
 - Total pages: 608

External links 
The Canadian Encyclopedia 
Biography at the Dictionary of Canadian Biography Online

Doctoral dissertation by Brian C. Thompson
Anthems and Minstrel Shows: The Life and Times of Calixa Lavallée (2015) biography by Brian C. Thompson
The Canadian Sheet Music Collection from the [University of Toronto Libraries, hosted at the [Internet Archive]

1842 births
1891 deaths
19th-century Canadian composers
19th-century Canadian musicians
19th-century classical composers
19th-century male musicians
Canadian choral conductors
Canadian classical composers
Canadian male classical composers
Canadian musical theatre composers
Canadian opera composers
Canadian people of the American Civil War
Canadian songwriters
French Quebecers
Male musical theatre composers
Male opera composers
Musicians from Quebec
National anthem writers
Burials at Notre Dame des Neiges Cemetery
People from Verchères, Quebec
People of Rhode Island in the American Civil War
Persons of National Historic Significance (Canada)
Romantic composers
United States military musicians